Arbi Lechayevich Mezhiyev (born 29 June 1993) is a Russian football player.

Club career
He made his professional debut in the Russian Football National League for FC Tom Tomsk on 24 August 2014 in a game against FC Sakhalin Yuzhno-Sakhalinsk.

References

External links
 
 

1993 births
Living people
Russian footballers
Footballers from Moscow
Russian expatriate footballers
Expatriate footballers in Latvia
Expatriate footballers in the Czech Republic
FC Tranzīts players
FK Ventspils players
Russian expatriate sportspeople in Latvia
FC Tom Tomsk players
Association football goalkeepers
FC Akhmat Grozny players
FC Dynamo Stavropol players
FC Saturn Ramenskoye players